The Heggur Tunnel is a road tunnel in Fjord Municipality in Møre og Romsdal county, Norway. The village is at the end of the Tafjorden which is surrounded by very steep mountains, where roads could not be built along the shoreline. The tunnel was built following the shoreline, but inside the mountain, giving drivers a safe passage to Tafjord.

References

Fjord (municipality)
Road tunnels in Møre og Romsdal